Kraszew  is a village in the administrative district of Gmina Dmosin, within Brzeziny County, Łódź Voivodeship, in central Poland.

Notable people
 

Jan Anuszczyk (born 1948), scientist and professor

References

Kraszew